Emma-Jane Feathery (born 25 December 1984) is a New Zealand rower.

2009 provided the opportunity for her to secure a seat in the New Zealand women's pair. Feathery was named in the boat with fellow eight rower Rebecca Scown and the pair competed at two World Rowing Cup events, winning both world cups and becoming World Rowing Cup leaders for their event in 2009. They went on to compete in the 2009 World Rowing Championships in Poznań, Poland and found themselves in one of the closest races of the regatta; there was only 1 second within the first three crews in the race and Scown and Feathery came in third, winning the bronze.

References

1984 births
Living people
New Zealand female rowers
World Rowing Championships medalists for New Zealand
21st-century New Zealand women